Stella Whitelaw (born 1941) is a British writer and journalist, who has published 58 novels, as well as over 400 short stories in national women's magazines. She began her writing career as a cub reporter and rose to become the first female chief reporter in London. Her writing career, over half a century, includes romance, cat stories, detective fiction, mystery, writing skills, and human nature.

She was Secretary of the Parliamentary Press Gallery at the House of Commons for almost 4 decades and worked with 11 United Kingdom prime ministers. First hand experience of the Airey Neave bombing. She lives in Surrey.

She was awarded an MBE in 2001 for services to journalism.  She won the Art of Writing competition in the London Magazine, judged by Sheridan Morley and the Elizabeth Goudge Cup at Guildford University.

She has lectured globally on many literary subjects. Politically her lecture Behind the Scenes at the Houses of Commons covers 37 years of UK politics with subjects as diverse as UK prime minister Margaret Thatcher's teeth.

Works
 Weave a Loving Web (1971)
When Jeanie Ross leaves the sheltered life of a Scottish orphanage to work as a seamstress in Carnegie Brown's fashionable London boutique “Rags”, her only ambition is to sew well enough to escape the wrath and sarcasm of the sewing-room supervisor, Madame Colette.
But the moment Jocelyn Tait, a spoilt and beautiful heiress, sets eyes on young Jeanie, a daring plan forms in Jocelyn's mind. The shy and timid Scots girl is thrown into a strange and bewildering new world of wealth - complicated by the unexpected arrival of Jocelyn's stern guardian, Luke Adamson.

 Love is a Star Garden (1974)
 Another Word for Love (1977)
 Sweet Chastity (1979)
 Grimalkin's Tales: Strange and Wonderful Cat Stories (1983)

 Desert Storm (1983)
Into the hot desert sun walks a man from Leila's past, the man she had fallen for when an innocent teenager. She had changed now and he did not recognise her. James Miller was in the Middle East to track down a secret device lost in a plane crash on the mysterious Black Mountain. His mind was not on that one night in Austria when Leila had thrown herself into his reluctant arms. Leila had tried to forget the humiliation, hardening her heart to all men, but during their perilous journey to find the Black Mountain, she discovers that the old magnetism is still there.

 Secret Taj (1984)
Chaperoning the teenage winner of a trip to Delhi was not high on Joanna Hamilton's list of desired job tasks. Nevertheless, she devotes herself to the onerous duty of escorting the rebellious teen through Northern India. Her task is made even more difficult by the documentary crew filming the journey - especially dealing with the autocratic director Matthew Howard.
Yet as they travel through the breathtaking landscapes of India, Joanna finds herself falling for the proud man, that is, until she is informed that their relationship could jeopardize all that he has worked for. Amongst the beauty of the Taj Mahal, Joanna must decide whether she should let him go, or fight for their blossoming love.

 Flood Tide (1986)
 Baptism of Fire (1989)
 Pennyroyal (1989)
 This Savage Sky (1990)
 Eagle's Eye (1990)
 Dragon Lady (1991)
 The Owl and the Pussycats (1993)
 A Certain Hunger (1993)
 Deluge (1994)
 Cruise Doctor (1996)
 No Darker Heaven (1996)
 Sweet Seduction (1997)
 Veil of Death (2004)
 Mirror Mirror (2006)
 Midsummer Madness (2009)
 "Portrait of a Murder" (2011)
 "The Prosecco Fortune" (2015)
 "Dangerous Shadows" (2017)

Non-Fiction
 How to Write and Sell a Synopsis (1993)
 How to Write a Short Short Story (1996)
 How to Write Short Short Stories (1996)
 How to Write and Sell a Book Proposal (2000)
  Book Proposals:  The Essential Guide (2011)

Book Series

Jordan Lacey Series

Pray and Die (2000)
Someone has to investigate the mean streets of Latching, West Sussex - and that someone is Jordan Lacey, ex-policewoman, now advertising her services as a private investigator in the local paper and working out of a junk shop in the quiet part of town. Will there be enough crime in the sleepy streets of Latching to keep her in business? It looks like there is. Ursula Carling is convinced that her husband is having an affair and employs Jordan to track down the mistress who is sending hate mail. But Ursula isn't telling Jordan everything: for example, her husband died eighteen months ago. Then Jordan discovers the body of a dead nun in an abandoned hotel, along with clues to a hidden World War Two fortune, clues which somehow connect to Ursula Carling. But when she tries to notify the police, in the shape of the devastatingly attractive DI James, she finds herself accused of crying wolf. Not even the slice of poisoned carrot cake she mysteriously received is enough to change his mind. Perhaps it will take an altogether more dramatic attempt on Jordan's life to make DI James sit up and take notice.

Wave and Die (2001)
In the sequel to Pray and Die, off-the-wall private investigator Jordan Lacey has progressed to cases of an entirely different class: from missing tortoises to stolen water lilies and vandalism at the Women's institute. But Sussex wives will be careless with their husbands, and soon enough Jordan is on the trail of another missing spouse. Complications arise when the husband in question is found dead in a burning showroom, and his 'wife' turns out not to be married to him. Then Jordan is accused of the arson attack at the scene of the crime and really starts to wonder whether sleuthing is her true vocation. There's a silver lining to every cloud, however, now that Jordan's in this deep, she doesn't have to via for the attention of dishy DI James, since he's hounding her.

Spin and Die (2002)
Zany and eccentric PI Jordan Lacey takes on her new case with verve and ingenuity. She is hired to follow Sonia Spiller, a woman suspected of a compensation fraud against a Latching department store. And then there's a second surveillance case in the same department store - to track down vanishing stock, posing as a temporary sales assistant. It's Christmas and Jordan even helps DI James buy a present for his mother. But when a man spins to his death on Hell's Revenge, a high-tech, scary funfair ride, Jordan realizes the cases are horribly linked. The plot thickens as Jordan herself is accused of being a stalker, a JCB destroys the bowling pavilion revealing some grisly remains and one of her friends gets beaten up. Jordan is even trapped in a watermill wheel - but will the dashing DI James come to her rescue?

Hide and Die (2003)
The fourth in the much-acclaimed Jordan Lacey series Jordan Lacey, Latching's intrepid and unconventional P.I., has two new cases to solve: a paternity dispute and a weird cross-dressing mystery. Neither case is as simple as it seems and during her roller-coaster investigations, she unearths more than she expects. She becomes entangled in a ten-year-old unsolved murder and it doesn't help when she is held hostage by a bull mastiff, engulfed by a freak tidal wave and poisoned by some suspicious parsley. Her own emotional dramas escalate when Detective Sergeant Ben Evans talks her into a holiday and Detective Inspector James, the object of her unrequited love, has a fit of old-fashioned jealousy.

Jest and Die (2004)
PI Jordan Lacey's next assignments have her up a tree carrying out nightly surveillance, and protecting a handsome comedian from a female stalker. When she accidentally unearths an international crime racket, the situation gets too dangerous, even for Jordan.

Ring and Die (2005)
Jordan Lacy, Latching's zany private eye, is thrown in the deep end literally when fishing rods start disappearing from the pier. Next, stolen pedigree puppies start adding to her case load. But it all gets more serious when one of the anglers is found hanging in the bell tower of a church, his past life shrouded in mystery. Then a cache of diamonds goes missing from a raided security box and a revengeful gang member is determined to find out where they are hidden.

Turn and Die (2007)
Jordan Lacey back by popular demand Jordan Lacey has a back-to-front mystery to solve. The lovely Holly Broughton has been acquitted of trying to murder her husband, but she hires Jordan to find out who framed her and why. When Jordan's life is threatened on three separate occasions, she realizes that she may, for once, be on the right track. Jordan finds herself propelled towards a solution that is claustrophobic and totally unexpected.

Fold and Die (2009)
The new Jordan Lacey mystery back by popular demand! - Jordan Lacey, Latchings zany but intrepid private eye, goes cruising to Norway as the undercover bodyguard of Joanna Carter, a woman who believes that her life is in danger. Then Joanna is murdered. Under suspicion for the crime, and hampered by storms, winds, and a cast of mysterious characters, can Jordan solve the mystery before it’s too late?

Jazz and Die (2014)
Jordan Lacey, former policewoman-turned-private-investigator, needs work, so when dishy DCI James offers the job of guarding Maddy, unruly daughter of a famous jazz trumpeter, from a stalker, she accepts immediately and heads off to the festival in Dorset in her new sports car, the Wasp. But discovering DCI James's cold case involves a victim the same age as Maddy, and from the same school, Jordan is sure there is a link. Events escalate, and Jordan must rely on her wits and training to keep Maddy safe. Once again she's on the heels of a cold-blooded murderer and is unstoppable in her determination to chase the killer down.

Jordan Lacey Investigates (2018)
Three gripping Jordan Lacey stories gathered together for the first time in one must-have collection.
Zany and eccentric PI Jordan Lacey takes on new cases with verve and ingenuity and in these stories, often she will bite off more than she can chew. In the tradition of classic murder-mysteries but with plenty of grit to boot, these gripping stories will have you on the edge of your seat.

Casey Jones Cruise Ship Mystery Series
 Second Sitting (2008)
A brand-new series from the creator of Jordan Lacey - Casey Jones is Cruise Director on board the luxurious Countess Georgina for her trip to the Caribbean. Casey’s days and nights are filled with an endless stream of prima donna singers and feather-clad chorus girls. But when a guest collapses during the second sitting at table two, and later dies, Casey finds herself trying to uncover a bizarre chain of events helped by the gorgeous Cruise Doctor, Samuel Mallory.

 Dead Slow Ahead (2008)
A Casey Jones Cruise Ship Mystery - Cruise Entertainments Director Casey Jones is back on board the Countess Georgina for the Mediterranean cruise. She has a new deputy the charming Lee Williams and a fresh troupe of entertainers. However, things on board don’t always run smoothly, and with a disgruntled guest reporting a missing couture Chanel gown, and items going missing from the ship boutique, Casey senses this cruise is not going to be all calm.

 A Wide Berth (2010)
Casey Jones is forced to abandon her planned holiday and head to Acapulco to join the Countess Aveline after crew member Tracy Coleman vanishes into thin air. It's possible that Tracy jumped ship rather than work for Pierre Arbour, a man who gives new meaning to the term obnoxious, but Casey suspects that something rather more sinister has occurred.

References

External links
 http://www.stellawhitelaw.co.uk
 http://www.fantasticfiction.co.uk/w/stella-whitelaw
 The story behind The Prosecco Fortune - Essay by Stella Whitelaw
 https://www.fantasticfiction.com/w/stella-whitelaw/pray-and-die.htm
 https://www.fantasticfiction.com/w/stella-whitelaw/wave-and-die.htm
 https://www.thriftbooks.com/w/spin-and-die_stella-whitelaw/1316336/#isbn=0727858319&idiq=5122151
 https://www.fantasticfiction.com/w/stella-whitelaw/hide-and-die.htm
 https://www.thriftbooks.com/w/jest-and-die_stella-whitelaw/1419866/#isbn=0727859803&idiq=5122190
 https://www.fantasticfiction.com/w/stella-whitelaw/ring-and-die.htm
 https://www.fantasticfiction.com/w/stella-whitelaw/turn-and-die.htm
 https://www.fantasticfiction.com/w/stella-whitelaw/fold-and-die.htm
 https://www.fantasticfiction.com/w/stella-whitelaw/jazz-and-die.htm
 https://www.fantasticfiction.com/w/stella-whitelaw/jordan-lacey-investigates.htm
 https://www.fantasticfiction.com/w/stella-whitelaw/jordan-lacey/
 https://www.fantasticfiction.com/w/stella-whitelaw/second-sitting.htm
 https://www.fantasticfiction.com/w/stella-whitelaw/dead-slow-ahead.htm
 https://www.fantasticfiction.com/w/stella-whitelaw/wide-berth.htm
 https://www.fictiondb.com/title/weave-a-loving-web~stella-whitelaw~228598.htm
 https://www.amazon.com/exec/obidos/ASIN/0708968341/ref=nosim/speculativefic05
 https://www.fantasticfiction.com/w/stella-whitelaw/secret-taj.htm

1941 births
Living people
British writers